Haguroyama Sojō, born as Osamu Annen (23 February 1934 — 8 February 2021) was a Japanese sumo wrestler from Hokkaidō.

Sumo career
As an active wrestler he was first known as Annenyama and reached a highest rank of sekiwake upon winning the top makuuchi division tournament championship in May 1957. Later in his career he was granted the sumo name Haguroyama, in honour of his father-in-law and stable boss, the 36th Yokozuna Haguroyama Masaji. He was also runner-up in the November 1959 tournament and over the course of his top division career earned ten gold stars for defeating yokozuna. However, he also lost all of 21 bouts against yokozuna Taihō Kōki.

Coaching career
After retiring in 1965 he remained in the sumo world as an elder under the name Oitekaze. He became head coach of Tatsunami stable in 1969 upon Haguroyama Masaji's death and adopted the name Tatsunami Oyakata. He inherited a number of strong wrestlers such as future ōzeki Asahikuni. He coached Kōji Kitao to the top division in 1984, who became the 60th Yokozuna Futahaguro in 1986. However, after the two had a heated argument in December 1987 Futahaguro struck Tatsunami's wife and stormed out of the stable.
Futahaguro was forced to resign by the Japan Sumo Association and Tatsunami filled out the yokozuna'''s retirement papers, the first time this had ever been done to a wrestler with elite sekitori status. Tatsunami was punished by a salary cut and told to stay away from all Sumo Association functions for three months. He later produced a number of other top division wrestlers such as Daishōhō and Daishōyama.

In February 1999 he reached the mandatory retirement age and passed on control of the stable to former komusubi Asahiyutaka, who had become his son-in-law and adopted son in April 1995. After their relationship soured and Asahiyutaka was divorced, he was ordered by the Tokyo District Court in February 2003 to pay Annen 175 million yen, the sum he would have had to pay for the right to the Tatsunami elder stock had he not been married to Annen's daughter. This was the first time a price had been revealed for elder stock, as the sums are normally kept secret. However, the Tokyo High Court in January 2004 overturned the original verdict.

Personal life and death
Haguroyama died in a hospital in Tokyo, on 8 February 2021, at the age of 86. His death was not formally announced by the Japan Sumo Association until December of the same year.

Career recordThe Kyushu tournament was first held in 1957, and the Nagoya tournament in 1958.''

See also 
List of sumo record holders
List of sumo tournament top division champions
Glossary of sumo terms
 List of past sumo wrestlers
List of sekiwake

References

External links 
 Complete career results

1934 births
2021 deaths
Japanese sumo wrestlers
Sekiwake
Sumo people from Hokkaido